Mahakan (also Romanized as Māhakān, Māhagān, Māhegān, Maheh Kan, Mahīkān, and Mahkan) is a village in Naharjan Rural District, Mud District, Sarbisheh County, South Khorasan Province, Iran. At the 2006 census, its population was 43, in 13 families.

References 

Populated places in Sarbisheh County